Luis Franco Mercado (June 21, 1928 – March 15, 2012) also known as Luis Gonzales, was a Philippine actor who appeared in more than 100 films during his career, most of them by Sampaguita Pictures.

Early life
Raised in Tondo, Manila, Gonzales may be best known for his portrayals of former President Ferdinand Marcos in three films: Iginuhit ng Tadhana (1965), a political propaganda film; Pinagbuklod ng Langit (1969), a dramatic film; and Kumander Dante (1988), an action film. Actress Gloria Romero starred opposite him as Imelda Marcos for the former two films. Gonzales and Romero starred in numerous other films together as well. They first worked together on the 1955 film, Despatsadora.

In December 2010, Gonzales received a star of the Eastwood Walk of Fame, which marked his last public appearance.

Death
Gonzales died of complications from pneumonia and heart problems at Makati Medical Center on the night of March 15, 2012, at the age of 83. He was survived by his wife, Vina Concepcion, and their three children. His funeral and burial were held at Santuario de San Antonio in Forbes Park, Makati.

Filmography

Film

References

External links

Date of birth unknown
1928 births
2012 deaths
20th-century Filipino male actors
21st-century Filipino male actors
Deaths from pneumonia in the Philippines
Filipino male film actors
Filipino male television actors
Male actors from Manila
People from Tondo, Manila